Ilo Airport  is an airport in the Moquegua Region of Peru serving the city of Ilo.

The Ilo VOR-DME (Ident: ILO) and Ilo non-directional beacon (Ident: ILO) are located on the field.

Airlines and destinations

Statistics

See also
Transport in Peru
List of airports in Peru

References

External links
OpenStreetMap - Ilo
OurAirports - Ilo
SkyVector - Ilo

Airports in Peru
Buildings and structures in Moquegua Region